Nocardioides psychrotolerans is a Gram-positive, non-spore-forming and rod-shaped bacterium from the genus Nocardioides which has been isolated from soil from the Hailuogou glacier in Sichuan Province, China.

References

External links
Type strain of Nocardioides psychrotolerans at BacDive -  the Bacterial Diversity Metadatabase
	

psychrotolerans
Bacteria described in 2013